North Bruny is a rural locality on Bruny Island in the local government area of Kingborough in the Hobart region of Tasmania. The 2016 census determined a population of 95 for the state suburb of North Bruny.

History
North Bruny was gazetted as the locality of North Bruny Island in 1967, and re-gazetted with its current name in 1974.

Geography
The D'Entrecasteaux Channel forms much of the western boundary, and Storm Bay is to the east.

Road infrastructure
The B66 route (Lennon Road / Bruny Island Main Road) starts at Roberts Point Boat Ramp in the west and runs east and then south before passing through Great Bay and exiting. Route C625 (a continuation of Bruny Island Main Road) starts at an intersection with B66 and runs north to Dennes Point, near the northern tip of the island. From there it turns south along the western shore as Nebraska Road and Killora Road (through Killora) until it reaches Quarantine Bay, where it turns east to eventually end a loop at an intersection with itself (C625) on Bruny Island Main Road.

References

Localities of Kingborough Council
Towns in Tasmania
Bruny Island